This article lists events occurring in Mexico during the year 2022. The article lists the most important political leaders during the year at both federal and state levels and will include a brief year-end summary of major social and economic issues. Cultural events, including major sporting events, are also listed.

Incumbents

President and cabinet
 President: Andres Manuel López Obrador 

 Interior: Adán Augusto López
 Foreign Affairs: Marcelo Ebrard
 Treasury: Rogelio Ramírez de la O
 Economy: Tatiana Clouthier Carrillo
 Environment: Maria Luisa Albores
 Tourism: Miguel Torruco Marqués
 Civil Service: Irma Sandoval-Ballesteros
 Health: Jorge Alcocer Varela
 Development: Román Meyer Falcón
 Welfare: Javier May Rodríguez
 Culture: Alejandra Frausto Guerrero
 Defense: Luis Cresencio Sandoval
 Navy: José Rafael Ojeda Durán
 Security: Rosa Icela Rodríguez
 Attorney General: Alejandro Gertz Manero

Supreme Court

 President of the Supreme Court: Arturo Zaldívar Lelo de Larrea

Governors

Aguascalientes: Martín Orozco Sandoval 
Baja California: Marina del Pilar Ávila Olmeda 
Baja California Sur: Víctor Manuel Castro Cosío  
Campeche: Layda Elena Sansores 
Chiapas: Rutilio Escandón 
Chihuahua: Javier Corral Jurado 
Coahuila: Miguel Ángel Riquelme Solís 
Colima: Indira Vizcaíno Silva 
Durango: José Rosas Aispuro 
Guanajuato: Diego Sinhué Rodríguez Vallejo 
Guerrero: Evelyn Salgado Pineda 
Hidalgo: Omar Fayad 
Jalisco: Enrique Alfaro Ramírez 
Mexico City: Claudia Sheinbaum 
México (state): Alfredo del Mazo Maza 
Michoacán: Alfredo Ramírez Bedolla 
Morelos: Cuauhtémoc Blanco 
Nayarit: Miguel Ángel Navarro Quintero 
Nuevo León: Samuel García Sepúlveda, 
Oaxaca: Alejandro Murat Hinojosa 
Puebla: Miguel Barbosa Huerta until december 13, Sergio Salomón Céspedes since december 15 
Querétaro: Mauricio Kuri González 
Quintana Roo: Carlos Joaquín González 
San Luis Potosí: Ricardo Gallardo Cardona 
Sinaloa: Rubén Rocha Moya 
Sonora: Alfonso Durazo Montaño 
Tabasco: Carlos Manuel Merino Campos 
Tamaulipas: Francisco Javier García Cabeza de Vaca 
Tlaxcala: Lorena Cuellar Cisneros 
Veracruz: Cuitláhuac García Jiménez 
Yucatán: Mauricio Vila Dosal 
Zacatecas: David Monreal Ávila

LXIV Legislature of the Mexican Congress

President of the Senate
Olga Sánchez Cordero

President of the Chamber of Deputies
Sergio Gutiérrez Luna

Events
Ongoing — COVID-19 pandemic in Mexico

January-March
2 March – Mexico voted on a United Nations resolution condemning Russia for its invasion of Ukraine.
5 March - Querétaro–Atlas riot
27 March - Las Tinajas massacre

April-June
10 April - 2022 Mexican presidential recall referendum
26 April - Mexico transited to the endemic phase.
23 May - Celaya massacre
5 June - 2022 Mexican local elections
16 June - FIFA makes its final selection for the sixteen venues to host matches during the 2026 World Cup, and three Mexican venus are selected: Estadio Azteca in Mexico City, Estadio BBVA in Monterrey, and Estadio Akron in Guadalajara.

July-September
19 September - 2022 Western Mexico earthquake

Sports

Association football
2021–22 Liga MX season
2021–22 Liga MX Femenil season

Motorsport
2022 Mexico City ePrix
2022 NACAM Formula 4 Championship

Tennis
2022 Abierto Mexicano Telcel
2022 Abierto Zapopan
2022 Guanajuato Open
2022 Monterrey Challenger
2022 Monterrey Open

Other sports
Mexico at the 2022 Winter Olympics
Mexico at the 2022 Winter Paralympics
2022 LFA season
2022 Pan Am Badminton Championships

Deaths

January 
15 January – María Cristina Sangri Aguilar, politician (born 1941).
21 January – Adolfo Lugo Verduzco, politician (born 1933).
23 January – Lourdes Maldonado López, journalist (born 1954).
27 January
Ruy Pérez Tamayo, medical pathologist, immunologist (born 1924).
Diego Verdaguer, singer (born 1951).
31 January – Onésimo Cepeda Silva, Roman Catholic prelate (born 1937).

February 
2 February – Alberto Baillères, billionaire businessman (born 1931).
3 February – Francisco Raúl Villalobos Padilla, Roman Catholic prelate (born 1921).
5 February – Rubén Fuentes, violinist and composer (born 1926).
9 February – Super Muñeco, professional wrestler (born 1962).
12 February – Héctor Pulido, footballer (born 1942).
19 February – Xavier Marc, actor, film director and cinematographer (born 1948).
21 February
Eduardo González Pálmer, footballer (born 1934).
Celeste Sánchez Romero, politician (born 1990).
22 February – José Isidro Guerrero Macías, Roman Catholic prelate (born 1951).

March 
2 March – Israel Beltrán Montes, businessman and politician (born 1947).
4 March – Juan Carlos Muñiz, journalist (born 1984).
7 March – Jesús Zúñiga, farmer and politician (born 1947).
8 March – Tomás Boy, footballer and manager (born 1951).
14 March – Francisco Solís Peón, politician (born 1968).
17 March – Martha Palafox Gutiérrez, politician (born 1949).
28 March – Raquel Pankowsky, actress (born 1952).

April 
4 April – Raziel, professional wrestler (born 1972).

June 

 23 June – Yrma Lydya, singer (born 1999).

July 
8 July - Luis Echeverria, politician (born 1922)

References

Footnotes

Citations

External links

 
Mexico
Mexico
2020s in Mexico
Years of the 21st century in Mexico